Suck: The First European Sex Paper was an underground pornographic magazine that celebrated free love and queer sexuality. Founded in London in 1969, its collaborators included Jim Haynes, William Levy, Heathcote Williams, Germaine Greer, and Jean Shrimpton. The United Kingdom banned the publication prior to its first issue.

References

Further reading 

 
 
 

1969 establishments in the United Kingdom
Free love advocates
LGBT-related magazines published in the United Kingdom
LGBT pornographic magazines
Magazines established in 1969
Pornographic magazines
Queer
Underground culture
1960s LGBT literature